Spain competed at the 2022 European Athletics Championships in Munich, Germany, between 15 and 21 August 2022

Medallists

Results

Spain entered the following athletes.

Men
Track & road events

Field events

Women
Track & road events

Field events

Combined events – Heptathlon

References

External links
European Athletics Championships

Nations at the 2022 European Athletics Championships
European Athletics Championships
2022